Light and Life is a Gypsy-led evangelical (Pentecostal) Christian movement that claims "up to 40% of British Gypsies" are part of it. Adherents pray for the sick, do not drink alcohol, or engage in fortune-telling, instead taking part in Charismatic prayer (including speaking in tongues).

The movement's founders include Jackie Boyd, a Romani Gypsy.

As of December 2015, Light and Life has 33 churches and 20,000 followers.

See also
 Gypsy Evangelical Mission in France (Life and Light)

References

External links
 

Evangelicalism in the United Kingdom
Romani Christians
Charismatic and Pentecostal Christianity